Adnan Al Hafez (born April 23, 1984) is a Syrian football goalkeeper. He currently plays for Spartak Buggenhout-Briel, which competes in the Belgium first division League VL. Brabant - Oost the best Sunday division in Belgium, wearing the number 1 jersey. He wears the number 22 shirt for the Syrian national football team.

Club career
Al Hafez started his professional career at the Syrian Premier League with Al-Karamah. On 27 July 2009, Al Hafez signed a two-year contract with Al-Taliya, but ten months later the contract has been dissolved.

On May 22, 2010, Al Hafez moved to Al-Wahda in the Syrian Premier League and signed a two-year contract.

International career
Al Hafez plays between 2003-2005 for the Under-19 Syrian national team. The Syrian U-19 team that finished in Fourth place in the AFC U-19 Championship 2004 in Malaysia and he was a part of the Syrian U-20 team in the FIFA U-20 World Cup 2005. in the Netherlands.
He plays against Canada, Italy in the group-stage of the FIFA U-20 World Cup 2005 and against Brazil in the Round of 16.

Appearances in major competitions

Honour and Titles

Club
Al-Karamah
Syrian Premier League (4 titles): 2006, 2007, 2008, 2009
Syrian Cup (3 titles): 2007, 2008, 2009
Syrian Super Cup (1 title): 2008
AFC Champions League: 2006 Runner-up

National Team
AFC U-19 Championship 2004: Fourth place
FIFA U-20 World Cup 2005: Round of 16

References

External links
 
 

1984 births
Living people
Sportspeople from Homs
Syrian footballers
Association football goalkeepers
Syria international footballers
Al-Wahda
Taliya SC players
Al-Karamah players
2011 AFC Asian Cup players
Footballers at the 2006 Asian Games
Asian Games competitors for Syria
Syrian Premier League players